Robert Kirkman's The Walking Dead: Descent is a post-apocalyptic horror novel written by Jay Bonansinga and released October 14, 2014. The novel is a spin-off of The Walking Dead comic book series and continues to explore the story of one of the series' most infamous characters, Lilly Caul. Descent is the first book in a second four-part series of novels.

Plot

Lilly Caul struggles to rebuild Woodbury after the Governor's shocking demise in a stunning and horrifying last act.

Out of the ashes of its dark past, Woodbury, Georgia, becomes an oasis of safety amidst the plague of the walking dead, a town reborn in the wake of its former tyrannical leader, Philip Blake, aka The Governor. Blake's legacy of madness still haunts this little walled community but Lilly Caul and a small ragtag band of survivors are determined to overcome their traumatic past...even as a vast stampede of zombies is closing in on them. Soon Lilly and the beleaguered townspeople must join forces with a mysterious religious sect fresh from the wilderness. Led by an enigmatic preacher named Jeremiah, this rogue church group seems tailor-made for Woodbury and Lilly's dream of a democratic, family-friendly future. But Jeremiah and his followers harbor a dark secret, the evidence of which very gradually begins to unravel. Now Lilly is caught in the dark center of a growing conflict...and it will take all of her instincts and skills to survive both the living and the dead.

References

2014 American novels
Descent
Thomas Dunne Books books